Louis Bourdaloue (20 August 1632 – 13 May 1704) was a French Jesuit and preacher.

Biography
He was born in Bourges. At the age of sixteen he entered the Society of Jesus, and was appointed successively professor of rhetoric, philosophy and moral theology, in various Jesuit colleges. His success as a preacher in the provinces led his superiors to call him to Paris in 1669 to occupy for a year the pulpit of the church of St. Louis. Owing to his eloquence he was speedily ranked in popular estimation with Corneille, Racine, and the other leading figures during the height of Louis XIV's reign. He preached at the court of Versailles during the Advent of 1670 and the Lent of 1672, and was subsequently called again to deliver the Lenten course of sermons in 1674, 1675, 1680 and 1682, and the Advent sermons of 1684, 1689 and 1693. This was all the more noteworthy as it was the custom never to call the same preacher more than three times to court.

On the Revocation of the Edict of Nantes he was sent to Languedoc to confirm the new converts in the Catholic faith, and he had much success in this delicate mission. Catholics and Protestants were unanimous in praising his fiery eloquence in the Lent sermons which he preached at Montpellier in 1686. Towards the close of his life he confined his ministry to charitable institutions, hospitals and prisons. He died in Paris on 13 May 1704.

His strength lay in his power of adapting himself to audiences of every kind. His influence was reportedly due as much to his character and his manners as to the force of his reasoning. Voltaire said that his sermons surpassed those of Jacques-Bénigne Bossuet (whose retirement in 1669, however, practically coincided with Bourdaloue's early pulpit utterances), and it is said that their simplicity and coherence as well as the direct appeal that they made to hearers of all classes gave them a superiority over the more profound sermons of Bossuet. Many of them have been adopted as textbooks in schools.

His sermons were revised and edited by François de Paule Bretonneau. Eight of his sermons were translated and published as Eight Sermons for Holy Week and Easter by George Francis Crowther in 1884.

Notes

References

1632 births
1704 deaths
17th-century French Jesuits
Clergy from Bourges
Sermon writers